The Minister for Justice was a portfolio in the Australian government between 18 September 1987, when the post was held by Michael Tate, and 20 December 2017, when the last incumbent of the office was Michael Keenan. Keenan was appointed to the post on 18 September 2013. Following a rearrangement of the Second Turnbull Ministry in December 2017, the post was subsumed into the newly-established portfolio of the Minister for Law Enforcement and Cybersecurity, part of the Home Affairs portfolio.

Former scope
The former minister was responsible for certain matters relating to criminal justice, law enforcement and national security including the Australian Federal Police and the Australian Criminal Intelligence Commission. The Minister for Justice was a junior minister who supported the Attorney-General, and previously administered the portfolio through the Attorney-General's Department.

From October 1998 to December 2007, the Minister for Justice was responsible for border control and the Australian Customs Service. From September 2010 to September 2013 the Minister for Justice also held the position of Minister for Home Affairs with broad responsibilities within the Attorney-General's Department.

List of former ministers for justice
The following individuals were appointed as Minister for Justice, or any of its precedent titles:

References

Justice